Strymon may refer to:

 Strymon (river), a river in Bulgaria and Greece
 Strymonian Gulf, a branch of the Thracian Sea
 Strymon (theme), a Byzantine province
 Strymon (butterfly), the genus of scrub hairstreaks, butterflies in the family Lycaenidae
 Strymon (mythology), a god in Greek mythology
 Strymon (company), a California-based brand of music electronics; specialized in guitar effects pedals

See also
 Strymonas, a former municipality in Greece